Chakli  is a savoury snack from India. It is a spiral shaped snack with a spiked surface.

Chakli is typically made from flours of rice, bengal gram (brown chickpea) and black gram (urad daal). It has several variations, depending on the types and proportion of flours used. Murukku, a similar snack typically made without the Bengal gram flour, is also sometimes called "chakli". Chakri is also a common nickname for "Chakradhar," a name of Indian origin. It's especially made for Diwali.
It's very popular in South Africa, introduced by the Indian diaspora. Maize flour is used instead of rice flour with the addition of salt and cumin as the basic dry ingredients. Sold by street vendors and at neighborhood shops. Generally, referred to as "murkoo" but also called "jaw-breakers" by others.

Names

Murukku, a similar dish typically made without the bengal gram, is also sometimes called "chakli". Kadboli is a similar dish, which is shaped by hand instead of an extruder.  In Indonesia, murukku and chakli variations are known as akar kelapa, and are particularly popular among Betawi.

Ingredients and preparation 

Chakli is made from flours of rice, bengal gram (chickpea) and black gram (urad dal). Other ingredients include coriander seed powder, cumin seed (jeera) powder, sesame seeds, red pepper powder, turmeric powder, salt, asafoetida powder and oil. Some variations also include green gram (moong) and pigeon pea (tuar/arhar) instead of black gram.

The flours and seed powders are mixed, and boiling water is added to make a dough. The dough is kneaded and shaped into circular forms, using a mould. In commercial food processing units, usually a chakli extruder is used for shaping the dough. The shaped dough is fried in hot oil, until it becomes brown in colour. It is then removed from the oil, drained and cooled.

See also
 List of Indian snacks
 Murukku

References

External links

Indian snack foods
Legume dishes
Chickpea dishes